S.T. Dupont is a French manufacturing company based in Paris, which has been making luxury goods since its founding in 1872. 
Products commercialised include handbags, lighters, collectible pens, perfumes (produced under license by Interparfums), cigarettes (made by Philip Morris International), and recently other gadgets using the trademark diamond-head pattern.

It is a wholly owned subsidiary of Hong Kong luxury goods company Dickson Concepts.

History 

Simon Tissot-Dupont (born in Savoy in 1847) founded a carriage company which was destroyed in a fire in 1872. The same year, he bought a workshop which made leather briefcases for diplomats and businessmen. In 1884, Dupont became the supplier to one of the world's largest shops – Les Grands Magasins du Louvre – while maintaining his private clientele.

Dupont handed over his company in 1919 to his sons, Lucien and André, who, trading under the name of Les Fils de S.T. Dupont (the Sons of S.T. Dupont), relaunched the activity. They focused on high-quality travel cases and accessories. Craftsmen were employed and patents were taken out to protect industrial secrets. 250 workers and 17 separate traders were involved in the manufacture, including goldsmiths, woodworkers, engravers, leather craftsmen, lacquer workers, and locksmiths.

In 1929, Lucien Tissot-Dupont was invited to New York by Louis Cartier to present his travel cases in their 5th Avenue shop. On the ship going to New York, he learned about the Wall Street crash. In response, on his subsequent return to Paris, he decided to move even further upmarket and cater to clients unaffected by the crash.

In 1971, Gillette purchased 48% of the stock of S.T. Dupont. In 1987, the company was sold to Dickson Concepts, a Hong Kong retailer of fashion products, watches and jewellery, as part of a restructuring plan announced by Gillette.

Products 

Dupont has gone on to produce lighters, pens, wallets, watches, cigarette (made by Philip Morris International) and fragrances. The company's first serially-produced lighter was created in 1941 and was made of aluminium, as brass was used as a strategic metal restricted for war purposes only.

From 1958 to 1963, all lighters were constructed of 18k solid gold with 3% brass.

References

External links 
 
 
 Gizmodo: S.T. Dupont Creates Palladium Flash Drive for the Well-Heeled

D
D
D
D
D
D
D